Jacinto Lara (5 June 1777, Carora – 25 February 1859, Barquisimeto) was a Venezuelan independence leader and hero of the Venezuelan War of Independence. His contribution included participating in Simón Bolívar's 1813 Admirable Campaign. He was briefly Prefect of the Intendency of the Magdalena River and the Isthmus in 1821. He later led a reserve division at the Battle of Ayacucho (1824), a decisive military encounter during the Peruvian War of Independence.

Legacy 

The Venezuelan state of Lara was named after him, as was Barquisimeto's airport (Jacinto Lara International Airport). He is buried in the National Pantheon of Venezuela.

Biography 

In 1812, he was appointed lieutenant colonel and goes to serve under command of Simon Bolivar and at the next year he fights in the battle of Cúcuta against colonel Ramón Correa. Along with Bolívar participated in the Admirable Campaign (Campaña Admirable) highlighting in the fights of Niquitao, Los Horcones and Taguanes, on 2, 11 and 31 July of that year. He continued with the Liberator participating in the siege of Puerto Cabello and in the battles of Bárbula and Trincheras (two actions near Naguanagua) and Vigirima.
 
In 1814, he took part in the Battle of Carabobo, on May 28, the day he turned 36, and then, under the orders of General Rafael Urdaneta, continued operations in the west of the country. He participated in the retreat to Nueva Granada, where the command of Urdaneta's forces is assumed by Bolívar, and they marched to Santafé de Bogotá to fight against Manuel Bernardo Álvarez, concluding the operation in December of that same year.

See also 

 History of Venezuela
 Venezuelan War of Independence
 Military career of Simón Bolívar
 Spanish American wars of independence

References 

 Jacinto Lara in Venezuelatuya

People of the Venezuelan War of Independence
Venezuelan revolutionaries
1777 births
1859 deaths
Burials at the National Pantheon of Venezuela
People from Lara (state)